Walid Lounis (born 7 April 1983), is a Tunisian-born Singaporean former footballer who last played for Woodlands Wellington FC in the S.League. He is also an accredited football coach in Singapore.

Football career
Lounis played for Gombak United, Geylang United, Home United  and Avenir Sportif de La Marsa.  After leaving Geylang United, he signed for Gombak United in 2011 and was retained in 2012 for the AFC Cup 2010 competition. 

Lounis joined Tanjong Pagar United in 2013.

Lounis obtained Singapore citizenship in 2007 but had never been called to the Singapore national football team.

Coaching career

Moving to coaching professionally in 2014 after retirement from professional football, had earned the coaching degrees from Asian Football Federation in 2012.

He had worked with the like of Fcbscola Singapore (Barcelona Academy), Coerver Football Singapore, Gombak United Football Club, Geylang International Football Club. 

Currently, technical director of International Soccer Academy. He guided them to one of the best seasons U16 Champion and U12 Champion.

Achievements 
Bronze medal for finishing 2nd runner up in the league 
Champion Singapore Cup 
Play in Asian Cup winner (AFC)
Singapore cup 2nd runner up 
Singapore cup runner up

References

1983 births
Living people
Singaporean footballers
Tunisian footballers
Naturalised citizens of Singapore
Geylang International FC players
Home United FC players
Gombak United FC players
Tanjong Pagar United FC players
Singapore Premier League players
Association football defenders
Singaporean people of Tunisian descent
Woodlands Wellington FC players
Kitchee SC players